New England Coffee is a coffee roaster located in New England. It was founded in Boston, Massachusetts in 1916 by Menelaos and George Kaloyanides.

History
In 1916, the Greek brothers Menelaos and George Kaloyanides, who had immigrated to the United States, started the New England Tea & Coffee Company. Originally located in a building at the corner of Milk and Broad Streets in Boston, hand-roasted coffee was once delivered by horse and wagon along the streets of Boston. The first gasoline-powered truck was purchased in 1918 and soon after, other family members started to join the growing business. 

In 1966, New England Coffee settled into its present location at 100 Charles Street in Malden, Massachusetts. Today, New England Coffee occupies five buildings and has expanded its manufacturing and packaging capabilities. 

Four generations of the Kaloyanides family have led the business since its inception: Menelaos Kaloyanides (1916-1966); Stephen Kaloyanides (1966-1996); James M. Kaloyanides (1996-2013), and James B. Kaloyanides (2013-2016). The Kaloyanides family has travelled throughout the world's coffee-growing regions; James B. eventually spent over half of a year in Costa Rica. In February 2022, James B. rejoined Reily Foods Company as Vice President and General Manager of New England Coffee, reprising his role as leader of the company that his great-grandfather began.  

New England Coffee offers coffee varietals, blends, flavored coffees, and full-bodied dark roasts with Arabica coffee beans. The Decaffeinated Colombian and Colombian Supremo have both been reviewed by Consumer Reports. In 2016, New England Coffee celebrated its 100th anniversary.

Availability
Today, New England Coffee serves over 10,000 Foodservice and Retail Customers nationally. Foodservice locations include: 
Restaurants					
Hotels and Inns
Coffee and Bagel Shops
Convenience Stores
Colleges and Universities
Healthcare
Cafeterias

New England Coffee Retail Ground Coffee is also sold at participating supermarket retailers such as at Targets and Walmarts throughout the United States.

References 

Coffee brands
Companies based in Middlesex County, Massachusetts
Food and drink companies established in 1916
Coffee companies of the United States